Pleurotus fuscosquamulosus is a species of fungus in the family Pleurotaceae. Found in South Africa, it was described as new to science by mycologists Derek Reid and Albert Eicker in 1998. The anamorphic form of the fungus is known as Antromycopsis fuscosquamulosus.

See also
List of Pleurotus species

References

External links

Fungi described in 1998
Fungi of Africa
Pleurotaceae